Kupperman or Kuppermann is a surname. Notable people with the surname include:

 Aron Kuppermann (1926–2011), American–Brazilian chemical physicist
 Charles Kupperman (1950– ), US National Security Advisor (former, acting)
 Howard Kupperman (1931–2014), American politician
 Iser Kuperman (1922–2006), draughts player
 Joel J. Kupperman (born 1936), American professor of philosophy
 Karen Ordahl Kupperman (born 1939), American historian
 Michael Kupperman (born 1966), American cartoonist
 Nathan Kuppermann, American pediatrician
 Robert Kupperman (1935–2006), American government official and academic

See also
 Kupferman, surname